Le Golfe-du-Saint-Laurent is a regional county municipality in the Côte-Nord region of far-eastern Quebec, Canada. It includes all communities along the Gulf of Saint Lawrence between the Natashquan River and the Newfoundland and Labrador border.

It has an area of  according to Quebec's Ministère des Affaires municipales, des Régions et de l'Occupation du territoire (which includes coastal, lake, and river water territory and also disputed land within Labrador), or a land area of  according to Statistics Canada.  The population from the Canada 2011 Census was 5126.

Le Golfe-du-Saint-Laurent and the neighbouring Minganie Regional County Municipality are grouped into the single census division of Minganie–Le Golfe-du-Saint-Laurent (known as Minganie–Basse-Côte-Nord before 2010).  The combined population at the Canada 2011 Census was 11,708.

Le Golfe-du-Saint-Laurent Regional County Municipality was created in July 2010, replacing Basse-Côte-Nord, which was a territory equivalent to a regional county municipality.  It is territorially much larger than Basse-Côte-Nord was, because at the time of its creation it received the (uninhabited) Petit-Mécatina unorganized territory in a transfer from Minganie Regional County Municipality.

Le Golfe-du-Saint-Laurent Regional County Municipality is characterized by the absence of road connections between the villages that are spread out along its  shoreline of the gulf. Except for Blanc-Sablon, all communities are only accessible by boat or plane, although Quebec Route 138 is being planned to extend all along the coast. Since the early 1990s, the region's commercial fishing industry has seen a steep decline, but a tourism industry is being developed to promote hunting and fishing outfitters, among other activities.

Subdivisions
There are 6 subdivisions and one native reserve within the RCM:

Municipalities
 Blanc-Sablon
 
 Bonne-Espérance
 
 Côte-Nord-du-Golfe-du-Saint-Laurent
 
 Gros-Mécatina
 
 Saint-Augustin
 

Unorganized territories
 Petit-Mécatina

Native Reserves
 La Romaine

Transportation

Access Routes
Highways and numbered routes that run through the municipality, including external routes that start or finish at the county border:

 Autoroutes
 None

 Principal Highways
 

 Secondary Highways
 None

 External Routes

River basins
There are a number of large rivers that flow in a generally north-south direction through Le Golfe-du-Saint-Laurent to enter the Gulf. Near the coast the river basins tend to narrow in towards the river mouth, and between their mouths are areas that drain into the Gulf through smaller streams. From west to east, the larger river basins, which may cover parts of Labrador or Minganie, are:

See also
 List of regional county municipalities and equivalent territories in Quebec

References

Regional county municipalities in Côte-Nord
States and territories established in 2010
2010 establishments in Quebec